Johnny Meg do Nascimento Osório (born August 6, 1985), known as just Johnny, is a Brazilian former professional footballer who played as a centre-back.

Career
Johnny was born in Lavras.

In January 2010 the German club VfL Bochum was interested in signing Johnny on a loan deal that fell through.

On 31 January 2010, Johnny joined newly promoted Chinese Super League side Nanchang Bayi for the start of the 2010 league season.

References

External links
 
 

1985 births
Living people
Brazilian footballers
Clube Náutico Capibaribe players
Association football defenders
Association football midfielders
União São João Esporte Clube players
Sport Club Corinthians Alagoano players
CR Vasco da Gama players
Tupi Football Club players
Ituano FC players
Shanghai Shenxin F.C. players
Qingdao Hainiu F.C. (1990) players
Yunnan Flying Tigers F.C. players
Chinese Super League players
China League One players
Brazilian expatriate footballers
Expatriate footballers in China
Brazilian expatriate sportspeople in China